Tazewell County Public Schools is the school district that administers all public schools in Tazewell County, Virginia, United States. The school system is managed by the School Board, based in Tazewell, Virginia, and the Division Superintendent is Dr. Christopher Stacy. The system comprises fourteen schools, thirteen of which are fully accredited by the Southern Association of Colleges and Schools.  As of the 2007-2008 school year, there were 6,911 students enrolled in the school system.

Schools

Elementary schools
Abbs Valley- Boissevain Elementary School, Boissevain
Cedar Bluff Elementary School, Cedar Bluff
Dudley Primary School, Bluefield
Graham Intermediate School, Bluefield
Tazewell Intermediate School, North Tazewell
Richlands Elementary School, Richlands
Tazewell Primary School, Tazewell

Middle schools
Graham Middle School, Bluefield
Richlands Middle School, Richlands
Tazewell Middle School, Tazewell

High schools
Graham High School, Bluefield
Richlands High School, Richlands
Tazewell High School, Tazewell

Specialty schools
Tazewell County Career and Technical Center

References

External links
Tazewell County Public Schools

Education in Tazewell County, Virginia
School divisions in Virginia